Madonna of the Seven Moons is a 1945 British drama film directed by Arthur Crabtree for Gainsborough Pictures and starring Phyllis Calvert, Stewart Granger and Patricia Roc. The film was produced by Rubeigh James Minney, with cinematography from Jack Cox and screenplay by Roland Pertwee. It was one of the Gainsborough melodramas.

Plot
A buried trauma from the past holds the key to the disappearance of a respectable married woman. Maddalena has a dual personality which leads her to forsake her husband and daughter, to flee to the house of the Seven Moons in Florence as the mistress of a jewel thief.

Cast
 Phyllis Calvert as Maddalena Labardi
 Stewart Granger as Nino Barucci
 Patricia Roc as Angela Labardi
 Peter Glenville as Sandro Barucci
 John Stuart as Giuseppe Labardi
 Nancy Price as Mama Barucci
 Reginald Tate as Doctor Charles Ackroyd
 Jean Kent as Vittoria
 Peter Murray-Hill as Jimmy Logan 
 Dulcie Gray as Nesta Logan
 Alan Haines as Evelyn
 Hilda Bayley as Mrs. Fiske
 Evelyn Darvell as Millie Fiske
 Amy Veness as Tessa
 Robert Speaight as Priest 
 Eliot Makeham as Bossi 
 Danny Green as Scorpi
 Helen Haye as Mother Superior

Calvert playing Roc’s glamorous mother was only four months her senior in real life.

Background
The film was based on a 1931 novel by Margery Lawrence.

Film rights were bought by Gaumont British in 1938 who wanted to turn it into a vehicle for Renée Saint-Cyr, as part of an ambitious slate for Gainsborough in 1939. However the advent of World War II disrupted these and plans to film Madonna were put on the backburner.

The project was re-activated in 1944 following the box office success of The Man in Grey and Fanny by Gaslight. It was the first film directed by Arthur Crabtree. He had spent many years previously working for Gainsborough as a cinematographer. Phyllis Calvert later recalled:
Arthur was a very good cinematographer, but there weren't enough directors, and so people who were scriptwriters or were behind the camera were suddenly made directors. It wasn't that Crabtree was an unsatisfactory director, just that we found ourselves very satisfactory – we did it ourselves. But the fact that he had been a lighting cameraman was wonderful for us, because he knew exactly how to photograph us.
Academic Sue Harper later wrote an analysis of the film, where she attributed producer  R.J. Minney as being the main creative force behind it. The story, which is supposed to be based on real case histories, begins with a rather explicit suggestion of interference or indecent assault on a devout, convent-educated young woman that causes her to develop split personalities.

Filmink dubbed Kent the "back up Margaret Lockwood".

Reception
The movie was very popular at the British box office, being one of the most seen films of its year. In 1946 readers of the Daily Mail voted the film their third most popular British movie from 1939 to 1945. According to Kinematograph Weekly the 'biggest winners' at the box office in 1945 Britain were The Seventh Veil, with "runners up" being (in release order), Madonna of the Seven Moons, Old Acquaintance, Frenchman's Creek, Mrs Parkington, Arsenic and Old Lace, Meet Me in St Louis, A Song to Remember, Since You Went Away, Here Come the Waves, Tonight and Every Night, Hollywood Canteen, They Were Sisters, The Princess and the Pirate, The Adventures of Susan, National Velvet, Mrs Skefflington, I Live in Grosvenor Square, Nob Hill, Perfect Strangers, Valley of Decision, Conflict and Duffy's Tavern. British "runners up" were They Were Sisters, I Live in Grosvenor Square, Perfect Strangers, Madonna of the Seven Moons, Waterloo Road, Blithe Spirit, The Way to the Stars, I'll Be Your Sweetheart, Dead of Night, Waltz Time and Henry V.

It was the only British film among the ten most popular films of 1946 in Australia.

Stewart Granger later called the film "terrible".

US release
British films had not traditionally performed well in the US but screenings to US soldiers in Britain led J Arthur Rank to feel that Madonna of the Seven Moons would do well there.

The movie was the first of a series of Rank films distributed in the US by Universal.

References

External links
 
 Madonna Of The Seven Moons at BFI Film & TV Database
 Review of film at Variety

1945 films
Films based on British novels
1945 drama films
British black-and-white films
Gainsborough Pictures films
Films directed by Arthur Crabtree
Melodrama films
British drama films
1945 directorial debut films
1940s English-language films
1940s British films